Yoshihiro Ohira (born 9 September 1940) is a Japanese alpine skier. He competed in two events at the 1964 Winter Olympics.

References

1940 births
Living people
Japanese male alpine skiers
Olympic alpine skiers of Japan
Alpine skiers at the 1964 Winter Olympics
Sportspeople from Hokkaido
People from Otaru
20th-century Japanese people